"A Human Work", also known by the Japanese title  is the seventh episode of the Japanese anime television series Neon Genesis Evangelion, which was created by Gainax. The episode, written by Hideaki Anno and Yoji Enokido and directed by Keiichi Sugiyama, was first broadcast on TV Tokyo on November 15, 1995. The series is set fifteen years after a worldwide cataclysm named Second Impact, and is mostly set in the futuristic, fortified city Tokyo-3. The series' protagonist is Shinji Ikari, a teenage boy who is recruited by his father Gendo to the organization Nerv to pilot a giant bio-mechanical mecha named Evangelion into combat with beings called Angels. In the episode, a rival organization of Nerv builds Jet Alone, a prototype giant robot with an onboard nuclear reactor as an alternative to the Evangelions. During the first public test of Jet Alone, it goes out of control and marches toward a nearby city with its reactor close to a meltdown. Shinji keeps the robot at bay in his Evangelion while Nerv's Major Misato Katsuragi gets inside Jet Alone and shuts down the reactor.

"A Human Work" contains quotes from Japanese and Western directors such as Stanley Kubrick, Kihachi Okamoto and Kunihiko Ikuhara, and cultural references to scientific and religious concepts, including apoptosis and the Tree of the Sephiroth. The episode's first broadcast  scored a 5.9% rating of audience share on Japanese television. "A Human Work" received a divided reception; some reviewers considered it to be a filler episode for the series' plot, while others appreciated the political implications and character development. The episode has been described as a deconstruction of the mecha genre and the Jet Alone affair as a parody of the stylistic features of giant robot stories.

Plot
Commander Gendo Ikari, head of the special agency Nerv, talks via telephone to Ryoji Kaji, who tells Ikari he has answered the information requests with falsified data, and then asks if he should do something about "that other matter". Ikari boards an SSTO and talks with an unknown person who says the budget for building more Evangelion mechas has been approved. Meanwhile, young Evangelion pilot Shinji Ikari is embarrassed by his legal guardian Major Misato Katsuragi's sloppy behavior. Shinji is also briefed on the truth about Second Impact by Dr. Ritsuko Akagi, who tells him that the official story about a freak meteor-strike is a cover-up. In reality, the catastrophe was caused by the sudden awakening of an Angel in Antarctica. It is believed that the Angels' ultimate goal is to cause Third Impact, and it is hoped that Nerv can prevent this outcome by fighting the Angels with the Evangelions. Meanwhile, Misato, who is present at Shinji's briefing, is uncharacteristically quiet and deep in thought as Ritsuko speaks.

Misato and Ritsuko attend a private company's demonstration of Jet Alone, its giant, Angel-fighting robot. During the demonstration, the robot goes out of control and its reactor becomes critical. Because the radio command circuit has been broken, Misato decides to catch Jet Alone using Shinji's mecha, Eva-01, enter Jet Alone and delete its programming directly with the code "Hope". Shinji catches Jet Alone and Misato successfully boards it. The password fails to stop the reactor and Misato attempts to manually push the control rods back into the reactor. At the last moment, the rods reinsert themselves. Misato realizes the robot was never intended to melt down and that the whole situation was a result of sabotage. Later, Ritsuko and Ikari speak in his office; she explains that their plan with Jet Alone went off with no problems, other than Misato's attempted interference, and he congratulates her on a job well done. The next morning, Shinji is upset again for Misato's behavior at home, until his school friends Toji Suzuhara and Kensuke Aida say that Misato shows him a side of her personality no one else sees because she considers him family. Shinji smiles wistfully at that thought.

Production

Yoji Enokido and Neon Genesis Evangelion director Hideaki Anno wrote the script for the episode; director Anno also worked on the storyboards, while Keiichi Sugiyama served as the episode's director. Masahiko Otsuka worked as assistant director, Shunji Suzuki as chief animator and Mitsumu Wogi as assistant character designer.

For the Jet Alone dossier visible in the first scene of "A Human Work", produced by the Gainax Shop, the staff recreated the original material generated with a Macintosh and modified it. The episode also depicts real-life vehicles such as an SSTO spacecraft. and a Ferrari 328. The American Northrop YB-49 prototype jet-powered heavy bomber was initially chosen for the image of the Eva transport aircraft, but the crew later decided to use the North American XB-70 Valkyrie.  Eva-01 was intentionally represented while chasing the Jet Alone in the same scene. In reality, the Eva would have to stumble forward, but the staff wanted the flow to be more fluid, creating a scene in which the Eva chases the other mecha. The episode also contains homages to the animator Kunihiko Ikuhara, a friend of the director Anno, and Kihachi Okamoto, of whom it takes up various directing techniques.

Koichi Yamadera, Hiro Yūki, Tetsuya Iwanaga, Tomokazu Seki and Megumi Hayashibara, voice actors of several main characters in the series, played unidentified characters for "A Human Work", including announcers and Shinji's unnamed classmates. A four-beat Jazz version of Fly Me to the Moon sung by Japanese singer Yoko Takahashi was used as the ending theme.

Cultural references and themes

In the first scene Gendo is framed in his office and the Tree of the Sephiroth, a diagram of the Jewish Kabbalah, is visible on the ceiling of the room. The ceiling illustration of Commander Ikari is taken from Athanasius Kircher's Oedipus Aegyptiacus. According to MCC Agora, some of the discernible Hebrew words of the diagram translate to "thunder" and "God", a possible link to the Angel Ramiel, defeated in the previous episode, which name means "thunder of God". Slant Magazine Micheal Peterson noted that Gendo's position at the desk "is in relation to the Godhead symbol on the tree". In the same scene, a text that mentions apoptosis and apobiosis, terms of molecular biology, is framed.

A school text by Shinji with fictitious, manipulated details on Second Impact and revelations on First Impact is framed in the episode; the informations constitute a reference to the Giant-impact hypothesis. Japanese architect Yasutaka Yoshimura regarded SSTO's interior visible in the previous scenes as a possible reference to a spacecraft visible in the movie 2001: A Space Odyssey (1968), while Jet Alone's name comes from the robot Jet Jaguar, appeared in the special effects film Godzilla vs. Megalon (1973) and originally called "Red Alone".

The episode's pivotal theme is interpersonal communication. In "A Human Work", the psychology of Shinji, who finishes the first part of his path in the episode, and of Misato is deepened. At the center of the episode are the different aspects of Misato's psychology; Misato has various masks and shows herself to be an elder sister, a rough spinster and daring soldier, confusing Shinji. At the end of the episode, Shinji notices Misato shows her coarser, vulnerable side because he is part of her family; after the event, the psychological distance between the two lessens. Misato also tries to stop the Jet Alone "with the hands of man" in "A Human Work". Optimism and hope towards human abilities are themes already present in earlier works of Hideaki Anno, like Gunbuster and Nadia: The Secret of Blue Water. Comic Book Resources's Matthee England described the Jet Alone affair as one of the more concentrated examples of Evangelion deconstruction of the mecha genre. For writer Dani Cavallaro, the mecha formula is turned in "A Human Work" into a vehicle for active engagement in political and economical satire. Critic Dennis Redmond similarly described the episode as a satire of "the arrogance of Japan's nuclear power lobby" and keiretsu business elite.

Reception

"A Human Work" had a mixed reception. The episode was first broadcast on November 15, 1995, and scored a 5.9% rating of audience share on Japanese TV.

Digitally Obsessed's reviewer Joel Cunningham criticized the episode as being probably the worst in the series and unnecessary; according to Cunningham, nothing happens and events remain unchanged at the end. He described the action scenes as "well done, but ultimately frivolous" and also said "there aren't even any particularly good character moments". According to Multiverity Comics' Matthew Garcia, "A Human Work" is not among Evangelion's best episodes, but it does manage to come together in the third act, in large part thanks to Misato.

Animé Café's Japanese reviewer Akio Nagatomi negatively received the episode, since it portrays governments as "simple-minded idiots", but also praised the sub-plots involving Misato's double face and the conspiracy that leads to the Jet Alone malfunction, the animation and some "neat" angle shots, like the drop-shipping of the Eva from the bomber. He concluded; "Not a great episode, though the political background has me a little intrigued". Film School Rejects's Max Covill said "A Human Work" does not advance the series' plot "in any meaningful way", but praised the scene involving Misato and Ritsuko. He described it as "an exciting episode" that provides additional background on important supporting characters. Animation Planet magazine' John Beam positively reviewed "A Human Work" and "Asuka Strikes!", and praised the show for its "outstanding characterizations, animations, and dramatic presentation". SyFy Wire's Daniel Dockery ranked the scenes of the Jet Alone activation and Misato inside it as one of the best "non-depressing moments" in the show, describing Misato as the most underrated Evangelion character and the second scene as a "tense" moment. Comic Book Resources' Devin Meenan also noted that, despite the episode seems inconsequential, "A Human Work" develops Shinji and Misato relationship.

In the second issue of the Gen:Lock webseries, a robot that is supposedly superior to gen:Lock named The Shogunate appears. Noting a character named Anno appears in the issue, Bubble Blabber's reviewer David Kaldor regarded The Shogunate as a possible reference to the Jet Alone. The episode also inspired official merchandise, including a line of official T-shirts.

See also

References
  Text was copied/adapted from Episode 07 at Evangelion wiki, which is released under a Creative Commons Attribution-Share Alike 3.0 (Unported) (CC-BY-SA 3.0) license.

Citations

Bibliography

External links
 

1995 Japanese television episodes
Neon Genesis Evangelion episodes
Science fiction television episodes